US Army 101 is a 2-8-0 steam locomotive that was originally operated by the United States Army. It is one of three survivors of the 1,500 General Pershing locomotives built in 1916–1918 for the War Department in World War I.  The 101 went on to see action in three wars — World War I, World War II, and the Korean War. After the Korean War, it was operated by the Korean National Railroad, which designated it 소리1-101 (Sori1).

History 

US Army 101 was built for the US Army for use in World War I by Baldwin Locomotive Works in 1918 and was under their ownership until it was donated to Korea in 1947.

In 1953, the 101 was recovered from damaged areas and reconstructed by the Army Transportation Corps, under the direction of Col. George Simpson. It was soon discovered that 101 was still property of the Korean Republic. Col. George Simpson, Harold T.I. Shannon, and Harold E. Fuller started talks with the Korean Republic about donating the engine to the National Railroad Museum.

In 1958 Korean Republic President Syngman Rhee donated the locomotive as a gift from the Korean people. On May 30, 1959, General Pershing was presented with a Certificate of Service from the Secretary of the Army.

It is one of only three surviving Pershing Class locomotives, the others being the Southern Pine Lumber Company No. 28 (or Texas State Railroad No. 300) and the CFR locomotive No. 140 117 in Romania.

See also 
 CFR
 Texas State Railroad

References

External links

National Railroad Museum
 William M. Griffin - One of the men who worked on the General Pershing in Korea.

Baldwin locomotives
2-8-0 locomotives
United States Army locomotives
Individual locomotives of the United States
Railway locomotives introduced in 1916
Standard gauge locomotives of the United States
Preserved steam locomotives of Wisconsin

ko:미육군 101호 기관차